The 1980–81 A Group was the 33rd season of the A Football Group, the top Bulgarian professional league for association football clubs, since its establishment in 1948.

Overview
It was contested by 16 teams, and CSKA Sofia won the championship.

League standings

Results

Champions
CSKA Sofia

Top scorers

References
Bulgaria - List of final tables (RSSSF)

First Professional Football League (Bulgaria) seasons
Bulgaria
1980–81 in Bulgarian football